Sakar District   is an abolished (former) district of Lebap Province in Turkmenistan. The administrative center of the district was the town of Sakar, Turkmenistan. Sakar was absorbed by Saýat District in November 2017.

References

Districts of Turkmenistan
Lebap Region